Stefano Agostini may refer to:
Stefano Agostini (cardinal) (1614–1683), Italian Roman Catholic cardinal
Stefano Agostini (cyclist) (born 1989), Italian professional road cyclist